John Cuthbertson was a Scottish footballer, who played for Hibernian, Third Lanark and Stenhousemuir. Cuthbertson scored for Hibernian in the 1947 Scottish Cup Final defeat by Aberdeen and helped the club win the 1947–48 Scottish League championship. It was reported that Cuthbertson scored the first Scottish Football League goal of the 1946–47 season, which meant that he scored the first competitive goal in Scottish football since the end of the Second World War.

Cuthbertson married Nancy in 1941.

References

External links 
Jock Cuthbertson, www.ihibs.co.uk

Year of birth missing
Year of death missing
Scottish footballers
Association football forwards
Craigmark Burntonians F.C. players
Hibernian F.C. players
Third Lanark A.C. players
Stenhousemuir F.C. players
Scottish Football League players
Scottish Football League representative players
People from Dalkeith
Sportspeople from Midlothian